The Summer and the Fall is the first studio album by People on Vacation, a supergroup composed of Ryan Hamilton from the indie rock band Smile Smile and Jaret Reddick from the pop punk band Bowling for Soup. The group released their debut EP on November 24, 2011 before releasing The Summer and the Fall on November 22, 2012. The songs "Rainy Day", "It's Not Love" and "Where Do We Go" were previously released on The Carry On EP and "This Is Me" was previously released on the Crappy Records compilation album, Crappy Records Presents: Have a Crappy Summer.

Track listing

B-sides
 "Mistake (Away from Me)"
 "Punk Rock World"

Personnel
People on Vacation
 Jaret Reddick — vocals, guitar, producer
 Ryan Hamilton — vocals, guitar, keyboards, producer
 Additional musicians:
 Linus of Hollywood - guitar, keyboards, producer
 Tom Polce (of Letters to Cleo) - drums
 James Stant - cello on "Back to Being Friends"
 Beau Wagener - bass guitar
 Todd Harwell - drums

References

2012 debut albums
People on Vacation albums